St. Stephen's University is a small liberal arts university located in the town of St. Stephen, New Brunswick, Canada.

History
Planning for the institution began in 1971 and the first students enrolled in 1975.  In 1998, the university received a charter from the provincial government to grant bachelor's and master's degrees in liberal arts and ministry studies.

Programs
St. Stephen's University is chartered by the province of New Brunswick to grant bachelor's and master's degrees. SSU offers undergraduate Bachelor of Arts degrees in humanities and social sciences. The postgraduate ministry program offers training for professional and lay ministry. SSU also offers an online graduate and undergraduate certificate program through its Institute for Religion, Peace and Justice.

Campus
St. Stephen's University has a small campus located on Main Street in the town of St. Stephen. The main building, called Park Hall, dates to the time of Canadian Confederation in the 19th century and is built in the Italian Renaissance Revival style of architecture. Park Hall houses the SSU administrative offices, academic facilities, as well as a residence. Further residences for students are located in two other buildings on the campus.

See also
 Higher education in New Brunswick
 List of universities in New Brunswick

References

External links
 

Universities in New Brunswick
Education in Charlotte County, New Brunswick
St. Stephen, New Brunswick
Private universities and colleges in Canada
Educational institutions established in 1971
1971 establishments in New Brunswick